The Australian Aircraft Kits Bushman is an Australian ultralight aircraft, designed and produced by Australian Aircraft Kits. The aircraft is supplied as a kit for amateur construction.

Design and development
Designed for STOL operations in the Australian outback and cattle mustering, the Bushman features a strut-braced high-wing, a two-seats-in-tandem enclosed cockpit, fixed conventional landing gear and a single engine in tractor configuration.

The aircraft is made from aluminium all-metal construction. Its  span wing employs flaps and is supported by V-struts with jury struts. The standard engine is the  Rotax 914 four-stroke powerplant. The landing gear is of a trailing idler-link design. Tundra tires are usually fitted for off-airport operations.

Specifications (Bushman)

References

External links

2000s Australian ultralight aircraft
Homebuilt aircraft
Single-engined tractor aircraft
Australian Aircraft Kits aircraft